The Victoria Road drill hall is a former military installation in Ulverston, Cumbria, England.

History
The building was designed as the headquarters of the 37th Lancashire Rifle Volunteers and completed in 1873. This unit evolved into the 4th Battalion the King's Own Royal Regiment (Lancaster) in 1908. The battalion was mobilised at the drill hall in August 1914 before being deployed to the Western Front. The battalion was disbanded shortly before the Second World War and the drill hall was made available for recreational use. It is now the Red Rose Social and Recreation Centre.

References

 
Drill halls in England
Buildings and structures in Cumbria
Ulverston